Maurice Louis Zinck (December 30, 1911 – 1988) was a Canadian politician. He represented the electoral district of Lunenburg East in the Nova Scotia House of Assembly from 1959 to 1974. He is a member of the Nova Scotia Progressive Conservative Party.

Zinck was born in Chester, Nova Scotia. He was a hardware merchant. In 1939, he married Annie Stanford Evans.

References

1911 births
1988 deaths
Progressive Conservative Association of Nova Scotia MLAs